The Aqueduct Museum of Hsinchu City is a museum in East District, Hsinchu City, Taiwan.

History
The museum was opened in April 2019.

Exhibitions
The museum exhibits the history of water supply in Hsinchu City and about the museum building itself.

Transportation
The museum is accessible within walking distance east of North Hsinchu Station of Taiwan Railways.

See also
 List of museums in Taiwan
 Water supply and sanitation in Taiwan

References

2019 establishments in Taiwan
Museums established in 2019
Museums in Hsinchu
Water supply and sanitation in Taiwan